Paraleptomenes is a primarily Indomalayan genus of potter wasps. There is a single species, Paraleptomenes miniatus, reported outside of the region, from the island of Mauritius in the Afrotropical region.

Species 
Paraleptomenes contains the following eleven species:

 Paraleptomenes communis Giordani Soika, 1994
 Paraleptomenes darugiriensis Kumar, Carpenter & Sharma, 2014
 Paraleptomenes guichardi Giordani Soika, 1994
 Paraleptomenes humbertianus (Saussure, 1867)
 Paraleptomenes incultus Nguyen & Nguyen, 2020
 Paraleptomenes kosempoensis (Schulthess, 1934)
 Paraleptomenes miniatus (Saussure, 1855)
 Paraleptomenes nurseanus Giordani Soika, 1970
 Paraleptomenes rufoniger Giordani Soika, 1994
 Paraleptomenes setaceus Bai, Chen & Li, 2022
 Paraleptomenes transfoveolus Bai, Chen & Li, 2022

References

Biological pest control wasps
Potter wasps